Sri Lanka: The Search for Justice  is an investigative documentary about the final weeks of the Sri Lankan Civil War by Callum Macrae.The documentary is about the search for justice for thousands of Sri Lankan Tamils and supports  international justice rather than a domestic process. It is being released under a slogan #LetThem Be Heard.

References

External links 

2015 in Sri Lanka
British television documentaries
Documentary films alleging war crimes
Documentary films about the Sri Lankan Civil War
British documentary films